Kristen Dalton may refer to:
 Kristen Dalton (actress) (born 1966), American actress
 Kristen Dalton (Miss USA) (born 1986), American beauty pageant titleholder